Spartacus: Blood and Sand is the first season of American television series Spartacus, which premiered on Starz on January 22, 2010. The series was inspired by the historical figure of Spartacus (played by Andy Whitfield), a Thracian gladiator  who from 73 to 71 BC led a major slave uprising against the Roman Republic. Executive producers Steven S. DeKnight and Robert Tapert focused on structuring the events of Spartacus' obscure early life leading up to the beginning of historical records.

Cast and characters

Slave
 Andy Whitfield as Spartacus – a Thracian warrior who is condemned to slavery as a gladiator.
 Manu Bennett as Crixus – a Gaul, he is Batiatus' top gladiator; prior to Spartacus. Naevia's lover and Lucretia's unwilling lover.
 Peter Mensah as Oenomaus/Doctore – an African slave who serves as trainer of Batiatus' gladiators.
 Nick E. Tarabay as Ashur – a former gladiator from Syria whose leg was crippled in the arena by Crixus; now serves Batiatus as a bookkeeper and henchman.
 Jai Courtney as Varro – a Roman citizen who sold himself to the ludus to support his family, and who soon becomes Spartacus' confidant and friend in the ludus.
 Antonio Te Maioha as Barca – nicknamed the "Beast of Carthage", he is one of Batiatus' most successful gladiators, serves as a bodyguard for his dominus.
 Eka Darville as Pietros – Barca's younger gay lover and partner.
 Lesley-Ann Brandt as Naevia – Lucretia's loyal body slave. She becomes Crixus' lover.
 Erin Cummings as Sura – Spartacus' wife.
 Katrina Law as Mira – a slave girl sent to seduce Spartacus and becomes his lover, under threat of death. Then she falls in love with him.
 Dan Feuerriegel as Agron – a new German gladiator recruit who helps Spartacus plot his uprising.

Roman
 John Hannah as Quintus Lentulus Batiatus – a lanista and Spartacus' dominus.
 Lucy Lawless as Lucretia – Batiatus' wife.
 Viva Bianca as Ilithyia – the daughter of Roman senator Albinius and wife of legatus Gaius Claudius Glaber.
 Craig Parker as Gaius Claudius Glaber – a legatus in the Roman Army who is responsible for Spartacus' enslavement.
 Craig Walsh Wrightson as Solonius – a former close friend, but now the greatest rival to the House of Batiatus.
 Brooke Williams as Aurelia – Varro's wife.

Style
The program is preceded by a warning that it purports to portray a "historical portrayal of ancient Roman society that contains graphic violence and adult content". Incidental nudity and scenes of a sexual or of a violent nature are present throughout.

Episodes

 The season premiere was simulcast on both Starz and Encore. On Encore, the premiere garnered 580,000 viewers.

Production
On December 22, 2009, the show was renewed for a second season but its production was postponed after Andy Whitfield was diagnosed with early-stage non-Hodgkin lymphoma. Starz announced in May 2010 that it would develop a six-episode prequel series, entitled Spartacus: Gods of the Arena, to allow star actor Whitfield to undergo medical treatment. The prequel featured both new and returning characters; it was headlined by John Hannah (as Batiatus) and Lucy Lawless (as Lucretia). Whitfield also provided a brief voice-over role. Filming began in New Zealand in the summer of 2010. The prequel aired beginning January 2011.

In June 2010, season two's pre-production resumed after Starz announced Whitfield was cancer-free. But when his cancer recurred, Starz replaced Whitfield (with the actor's consent) with Liam McIntyre as Spartacus for season two which is titled Spartacus: Vengeance. Andy Whitfield died on September 11, 2011.

International broadcast
Three days after the US  premiere, the series began airing in Canada on TMN beginning on January 25, 2010. RTL 5 announced in their January newsletter that Spartacus: Blood and Sand would debut in the Netherlands in March 2010. In the United Kingdom, Bravo began airing the series on May 25, 2010. Following the axe of the Bravo network on UK television, Sky1 picked up the rights to the series with plans to carry all subsequent seasons. The series was also scheduled to premiere in Poland on HBO Poland starting from June 19, 2010 and in Hungary on HBO Magyarország starting from June 1, 2010. The series aired in Ireland on TV3. In Brazil, the show aired on Globosat HD. In Turkey the show releases on CNBC-E TV, while in Italy Sky Television gained the rights of the series. In India and Pakistan, the show aired (as of June 2011) on HBO. In Slovenia, the series started airing on Kanal A on January 2, 2012, from Monday to Friday at 9.45 pm, and ended January 18, 2012.

Reception
The premiere episode of the series set a record for Starz, with 553,000 viewers on their network, and another 460,000 on Encore, where the show was available only that weekend. For the rest of the season the show had an average of 1.285 million viewers.
Critical reception of the first episode was mixed; the review aggregate website Metacritic which assigns a normalized average score out of 100 gave the show a score of 54% based on 22 reviews.
Ken Tucker of Entertainment Weekly gave it the grade B+, saying it "might prove to be the not-at-all-guilty pleasure of the season."
Barry Garron of The Hollywood Reporter suggested that with "such thin stories... it's small wonder that sex and violence are used to take up the slack." Robert Lloyd of the Los Angeles Times wrote that John Hannah as Batiatus "keeps the show grounded with a persuasive portrait of a man engaged in a stressful daily business" and called Whitfield as Spartacus "handsome and buff and smart and beastly."
Mark Perigard of the Boston Herald gave the season finale a positive review, rating it a B+. He commented on the improvement of the series throughout its first season.

Other media

Novels
In 2012 Titan Books announced the publication of a series of novels based on Spartacus: Blood and Sand. The first, titled Spartacus: Swords & Ashes, was written by J.M. Clements and released on January 3, 2012. The second book in the series was Spartacus: Morituri by Mark Morris.

Board game
In 2012 Gale Force Nine announced the creation of a licensed board game based on the series. The English language release, Spartacus: A Game of Blood and Treachery, had a limited release at Gen Con 2012 and a general release to game and hobby stores on September 28, 2012. Gameplay involves players taking on the role of Dominus, or head of a Roman house in ancient Rome, buying and trading assets, scheming with and against the other players, and battling in the arena. In May 2013 an expansion entitled Spartacus: The Serpents and the Wolf was released. The expansion allows for two extra players (to an updated maximum of six) with the addition of two more houses and includes alternative rules allowing for group battles in the arena.

Comics
Earlier, in 2009, Devil's Due had published a four-part prequel comic series titled Spartacus - Blood and Sand. Each issue spotlighted a character from the planned television series, mostly the minor gladiator rivals of the main cast. 

The series was adapted as a 4-part motion comic adaptation called Spartacus – Blood and Sand – Motion Comic. Ray Park and Heath Freeman were cast. Kyle Newman was the director, and the producers were Andy Collen and Jeff Krelitz.

References

External links

 
 

2010 American television seasons
Spartacus (TV series)
Gladiatorial combat in fiction